Singapore Standard Time (SST), also known as Singapore Time (SGT), is used in Singapore and is 8 hours ahead of UTC (UTC+08:00). Singapore does not observe daylight saving time.

History 
As part of the Straits Settlements, Singapore originally adopted the Malayan time, which was GMT+07:30 in 1941.

Following the Japanese occupation, Singapore (known as Syonan-to during this time) adopted the Tokyo Standard Time of GMT+09:00 on 15 February 1942.

At the end of World War II and the return of the Straits Settlements to the British, Singapore reverted to its pre-war time zone.

Daylight saving time in Singapore
Although Singapore does not currently observe daylight saving time in the traditional sense due to its tropical location, a form of daylight saving time, using a 20-minute offset, was introduced on an annual basis by the Legislative Council of the Straits Settlements in 1933.

On 2 July 1920, a bill was intituled as Daylight Saving Ordinance, 1920. It is to introduce a 30-minutes offset or seven and a half hour in advance of Greenwich mean time. The bill was read for the first time on 5 July 1920 but was later abandoned.

In 1932, Sir Arnold Percy Robinson raised the idea of 20-minute offset after an earlier attempt was abandoned in 1920 which was first proposed by Sir Laurence Guillemard for a 30-minute offset.
On 26 September 1932, a bill was intituled as Daylight Saving Ordinance, 1932. The Ordinance was passed at a meeting of the Legislative Council held on 5 December 1932 and approved by Sir Cecil Clementi (Governor) on 15 December 1932.

Between 1934 and 1935, the Daylight Saving Ordinance, 1932 was extended throughout both years by Gazette Notifications. The 20-minute offset was formally adopted as standard time in Singapore in 1936, and on 1 September 1941 the offset was increased to 30 minutes, the same as the 1920 proposal.

Malaysian standardisation 
In 1981, Malaysia decided to standardise the time across its territories to a uniform UTC+08:00. Singapore elected to follow suit, citing business and travel schedules. The change took effect on 1 January 1982, when Singapore moved half an hour forward, on 31 December 1981 at 11:30 pm, creating "Singapore Standard Time" (SST). SST is 8 hours ahead of UTC and is synchronised with Beijing, Hong Kong, Manila, Shanghai, Taipei and Perth.

Timeline

Legislation
Section 51(2) of the Interpretation Act 1965 (2020 Revised Edition) states ““Standard time” means standard time as used in Singapore, namely, 8 hours, or such other period as may from time to time be determined by the President by notification in the Gazette, in advance of Coordinated Universal Time.”

Timekeeper 

In the early days, Singapore used a timeball on Fort Canning and Mount Faber for sailors to check with their chronometers by the falling ball at exactly 1 p.m daily. When the second world war came to Singapore, the Public Works Department (PWD) cut the masts down as the masts formed "ideal" markers for artillery. After the war, the timeball became redundant as most ships now had wireless to give them time signals.

The Time & Frequency Laboratory of A*STAR's National Metrology Centre (NMC) establishes, maintains and disseminates the Coordinated Universal Time of Singapore, UTC (SG) and Singapore Standard Time (SST), the national time scale of Singapore. The difference between UTC+08:00 and SST is never more than 0.9 seconds. NMC maintains five caesium atomic clocks and one hydrogen maser atomic clock.

IANA time zone database
The IANA time zone database contains one zone for Singapore in the file zone.tab:

See also 

ASEAN Common Time

References

External links 
Singapore Standard Time
National Metrology Centre

Time zones
Time in Singapore
Time in Southeast Asia